The Face Vietnam ( (season 1–2) or  from season 3) is a Vietnamese modeling-themed reality television series, based on the US television series of the same name, and one of several national editions in the international The Face franchise. Hồ Ngọc Hà, Phạm Hương and Lan Khuê served as model coaches and Vĩnh Thụy served as a host for the first season. The first season premiered on 18 June 2016 on VTV3.

In the second season, Lan Khuê, Hoàng Thùy and Minh Tú served as model coaches and Hữu Vi served as a host. The second season premiered on 11 June 2017 on VTV3. The third season premiered on 18 October 2020.

Hosts and mentors

Seasons 

Mentor's color symbols
 Team Lan Khuê (Season 1–2)
 Team Hồ Ngọc Hà (Season 1)
 Team Phạm Hương (Season 1)
 Team Hoàng Thùy (Season 2)
 Team Minh Tú (Season 2)
 Team Võ Hoàng Yến (Season 3)
 Team Minh Hằng (Season 3)
 Team Thanh Hằng (Season 3)
 Team Anh Thư (Season 4)
 Team Thu Phương (Season 4)
 Team Kỳ Duyên & Minh Triệu (Season 4)

Spin-offs
 The Look Vietnam (2017)
 The Face Online by Vespa (2021)

See also
 The Face Australia
 The Face Thailand
 The Face United Kingdom
 The Face United States
 The Face Men
List of television programmes broadcast by Vietnam Television (VTV)

References

External links 
List of broadcasts of Vietnam Television (VTV)

2016 Vietnamese television series debuts
Vietnamese reality television series
Vietnam Television original programming
2010s Vietnamese television series
Vietnam
Vietnamese television series based on American television series